9 is a 2018 Burmese thriller-drama television series. It aired on MRTV-4, from January 22 to February 14, 2018, on Mondays to Fridays at 19:00 for 18 episodes.

Cast
Thar Htet Nyan Zaw as Toe Tet
Saw Min Yar as Arkar
Hsu Waddy as Hay Man
Great Chan as Nay Chi
Phyo Than Thar Cho as Honey Cho
La Pyae as Min Min Maung
Wai Yan Kyaw as Ko Ko Aung
Hsu Sandi Yoon as Wah Wah Myint
Nay Yee as Yamone
Phone Sett Thwin as Deputy Sheriff Aye Ko

References

Burmese television series
MRTV (TV network) original programming